La Familia ( "the family") may refer to:
La familia, a Mexican telenovela
La Familia (album), a 2014 album by Colombian singer J Balvin
La Familia (Beitar supporters' group), an Association supporters' group of Israeli Premier League club Beitar Jerusalem
La familia (film), a 2017 Venezuelan film
La Familia (professional wrestling), a former WWE stable
La Familia (rap group), a Bucharest-based rap group founded in 1995, among the first hip hop acts in Romania
La Familia Michoacana, a drug cartel
 La Familia ("The Family"), original title of Velázquez's painting Las Meninas

See also 

 Familia (disambiguation)
 Family (disambiguation)
 Sagrada Familia (disambiguation)